The Chicken in the Case is a 1921 American silent comedy film directed by Victor Heerman and starring Owen Moore, Vivia Ogden and Teddy Sampson.

Plot
As described in a film magazine review, Steve Perkins  decides to borrow Winnie, the newly acquired wife of his room mate Fercival, in order to meet his Aunt Sarah's wishes and get his inheritance sooner. The aunt is so impressed with Winifred that she leaves the money in the name of the framed-up wife. Aunty, however, runs into Winifred and her real husband Percy together and it looks suspicious to her. Of course, after that she stumbles across all kinds of suspicious circumstancial evidence and, after many kinds of humorous complications during which Steve really gets married to someone else, the whole plot is unraveled, Steve confesses to the hoax, and it all comes out right.

Cast
 Owen Moore as Steve Perkins 
 Vivia Ogden as Aunt Sarah 
 Teddy Sampson as Winnie Jones 
 Edgar Nelson as Percival Jones 
 Katherine Perry as Ruth Whitman 
 Linus Aaberg as Maj. Whitman

References

Bibliography
 Munden, Kenneth White. The American Film Institute Catalog of Motion Pictures Produced in the United States, Part 1. University of California Press, 1997.

External links

 

1921 films
1921 comedy films
1920s English-language films
American silent feature films
Silent American comedy films
American black-and-white films
Films directed by Victor Heerman
Selznick Pictures films
1920s American films